George Payne Kahari (20 July 1930 – 23 July 2021) was a Zimbabwean diplomat, educator, arts administrator and writer. He served as an ambassador to Germany, Italy and Czechoslovakia. He has been Visiting Professor of Modern African Literature at a number of American universities. After his stint as a diplomat, Professor Kahari was the first black director at the National Gallery of Zimbabwe. He was one of the founders of the Catholic University of Zimbabwe, which was established in 1999.

Background 
Kahari was born at Chiriseri in Bindura. His father was a teacher at the Salvation Army's Howard Institute and later joined the British South Africa Police. He had one brother who died young, and was raised as an only child.

Publications 

 2015. The Odyssey of Shona Narratives: A Collation and Collection of Articles and Conference Papers (1964-2012). Mambo Press, Gweru.
 2015.  A Standard Dictionary of Shona-English Names. College Press, Harare.
 2009.  The Search For Identity And Ufuru: An Introduction To The Black Zimbabwean Fiction in English, 1956 – 1980. Mambo Press, Gweru.
 1994. The Moral Vision of Patrick Chakaipa: A Study in Didacticism and Literary Eschatology. Mambo Press, Gweru.
 1994. Romances of Patrick Chakaipa: A Study of Thematic Techniques and Mythology. Mambo Press, Gweru.
 1994. The Rise of the Shona Novel: A Study in Development, 1890-1984. Mambo Press, Gweru.
 1990. Plots And Characters in Shona Fiction, 1956-1984: A Handbook. Mambo Press, Gweru.
 1987. Herbert W. Chitepo’s Epic Poem, Soko Risina Musoro – The Tale without a Head: A Critique. Longman, Zimbabwe.
 1986. Aspects of the Shona Novel and Other Related Genres. Mambo Press, Gweru.
 1980. The Search for Zimbabwean Identity: An Introduction to the Black Zimbabwean Novel. Mambo Press, Gweru.
 1975. The Imaginative Writings of Paul Chidyausiku. Mambo Press, Gwelo, (in Association with the Rhodesia Literature Bureau), 1975.
 1972. Kuverenga Chishona: An Introductory Shona Reader with Grammatical Sketch/ by Kahari and Hezel Carter, School of Oriental and African Studies, University of London.
 1972. The Novels of Patrick Chakaipa. Longman Rhodesia, (in Association with the Rhodesia Literature Bureau).

References 

1930 births
2021 deaths
Zimbabwean writers
Zimbabwean diplomats
People from Bindura
Ambassadors of Zimbabwe to Germany
Ambassadors of Zimbabwe to Italy
Ambassadors of Zimbabwe to Czechoslovakia